Ukrainian World Congress ( or СКУ) is a non-profit organization, nonpartisan association, international coordination assembly of all Ukrainian public organizations in diaspora. It represents the interests of over 20 million Ukrainians.

General information

The congress has member organizations in 33 countries and ties with Ukrainians in 14 additional countries. Founded in 1967 in New York City as the World Congress of Free Ukrainians. The organization was renamed in 1993 to its current name. In 2003, the Ukrainian World Congress was recognized by the United Nations Economic and Social Council as a non-governmental organization (NGO) with special consultative status.

Goals and Objectives

The main goals and objectives of the UWC are to:
1)	represent the interests of Ukrainians in the diaspora;
2)	coordinate an international network of member organizations that support and promote the Ukrainian national identity, spirit, language, culture and achievements of Ukrainians throughout the world;
3)	promote the civic development of Ukrainians in their countries of settlement, while fostering a positive attitude towards Ukrainians and the Ukrainian state; and
4)	defend the rights of Ukrainians, independently of their place of residence in accordance with the Universal Declaration of Human Rights.

Leadership

From 2008 to 2018, Eugene Czolij from Canada has been President of the UWC. He was elected in 2008 by the IX World Congress of Ukrainians. Now ten years later on the XI Ukrainian World Congress, which took place in November 2018 in Kyiv, Paul Grod also from Canada has been elected new president of the UWC. 

Members of the Executive Committee include:
Jaroszlava Hartyanyi, Hungary, 1st vice-president
Irene Sushko, Canada, 2nd vice-president, President of the World Federation of Ukrainian Women's Organizations
Stefan Romaniw, Australia, Secretary-General
Ihor Laszok, USA, Financial Officer
Zenon Potichnyj, Canada, Treasurer

Councils and Committees

13 UWC councils and committees work actively to address questions that define Ukrainian community life. These include human and civil rights, UN matters, awareness of the Holodomor in the international community, education, social services, youth, assistance to Ukrainian citizens living abroad, scholarly matters, culture, the fight against human trafficking, media, sport and the cooperative movement.

Priority Issues

Currently, the UWC has been actively promoting Ukraine's Euro-integration in meetings with high-ranking officials of the European Union. The UWC has called for the signing of the EU-Ukraine Association Agreement as early as 25 February 2013 during the EU-Ukraine Summit in Brussels, Belgium.

The UWC has focused on such important issues as: the protection and defence of the human and national minority rights of Ukrainians; the international recognition of the Holodomor of 1932-33 as an act of genocide (now officially recognized by 16 countries); the democratization of Ukraine and its integration into the European Union; the strengthening of Ukraine as a state and the inviolability of its borders; election monitoring, including the UWC’s International Election Observation Mission to the 2012 Parliamentary Elections in Ukraine (the largest non-government sponsored mission of its kind); the social and economic issues surrounding the economic migration from Ukraine; the promotion of the Ukrainian language in Ukraine and the diaspora; the return to the Ukrainian community in Poland of the Ukrainian National Home in Przemyszl which was confiscated during the Operation Vistula (Akcja Wisla); and the global problem of human trafficking.

Since Ukraine’s independence in 1991, the UWC has been helping Ukraine become the natural epicentre for Ukrainianism throughout the world for the benefit of Ukrainians both in Ukraine and abroad.

Members
 European Congress of Ukrainians (Yaroslava Khortiani)
 Armenia: Federation of Ukrainians of Armenia "Ukraine"
 Belgium: Main Council of Ukrainian Public Organizations
 Bosnia and Herzegovina: Coordination council of Ukrainian associations
 Czech Republic: Ukrainian Initiative in the Czech Republic
 Croatia: Union of Rusyns and Ukrainians of the Republic of Croatia
 Estonia: Congress of Ukrainians of Estonia
 France: Representative Committee of the Ukrainian Community of France
 Georgia: Coordination Council of Ukrainians of Georgia
 Germany: Association of Ukrainian Organizations in Germany
 Greece: Association of the Ukrainian diaspora in Greece "Ukrainian-Greek Thought"
 Hungary: Association of Ukrainian Culture in Hungary
 Italy
 Latvia: Ukrainian Cultural-Enlightening Association in Latvia "Dnieper"
 Lithuania: Community of Ukrainians of Lithuania
 Moldova: Society of Ukrainians of Transnistria
 Norway
 Poland: Association of Ukrainians in Poland (Piotr Tyma)
 Portugal: Society of Ukrainians in Portugal
 Romania: Union of Ukrainians of Romania
 Russia: Association of Ukrainians of Russia
 Serbia
 Slovakia: Union of Rusyn-Ukrainians of the Slovak Republic
 Spain
 Switzerland
 United Kingdom: Association of Ukrainians in Great Britain (Zenko Lastowiecki)
 World Federation of Ukrainian Women's Organizations
 World Congress of Ukrainian Youth Organization
 Others
 Australia: Australian Federation of Ukrainian Organisations (Stefan Romaniw)
 Argentina: Ukrainian Central Representation in Argentina
 Brazil: Ukrainian-Brazilian Central Representation
 Canada: Ukrainian Canadian Congress (Paul Grod)
 Kazakhstan: Ukrainians in Kazakhstan
 Paraguay:
 United States: Ukrainian Congress Committee of America (Andriy Futey)
 United States: Ukrainian American Coordinating Council (Ihor Gawdiak) 
 Uzbekistan: Ukrainian Cultural Center "Fatherland"

List of all congresses

See also
 Ukrainian Universal Coordination Council

Archives 
There is a World Congress of Free Ukrainians fonds at Library and Archives Canada. The archival reference number is R11211.

References

Sources
 Official Web site

Ukrainian diaspora organizations
Organizations established in 1967
Undesirable organizations in Russia